Larry Parker Jr (born July 14, 1976) is a former American football wide receiver in the National Football League. He was drafted by the Kansas City Chiefs in the fourth round of the 1999 NFL Draft. He played college football at USC.

References
http://www.nfl.com/players/profile?id=PAR354961
http://www.usctrojans.com/sports/m-footbl/archive/mtt/players/usc-m-fb-parker.html
https://www.sports-reference.com/cfb/players/larry-parker-3.html

1976 births
Living people
American football wide receivers
USC Trojans football players
Kansas City Chiefs players